Saraca L. is a genus of flowering plants in the family Fabaceae (legume family) of about 20 plant species of trees native to the lands from India, China and Ceylon to Malaysia and Sulawesi.

This plant can be grown outdoors in distinctly warm humid climates, and prefer a moist, well-drained soil with plenty of organic matter.  It can also be grown within greenhouses. The trees themselves are grown for their clustered, upturned flowers in yellow, orange or red.  The tree's flowers lack petals, having brightly colored sepals, and have stamens projecting up to eight inches long.  The leaves are pinnate, with paired leaflets. Typically, these trees are accustomed to the shade of other trees.  Most species of Saraca are associated with particular bodies of water.  The species Saraca asoca is believed to be the tree under which Buddha was born. Red saraca is the provincial tree of Yala province, Thailand.

Species
Species include:

 Saraca asoca or ashoka tree
 Saraca celebica
 Saraca declinata
 Saraca dives
 Saraca griffithiana
 Saraca hullettii
 Saraca indica
 Saraca monodelpha
 Saraca thaipingensis
 Saraca tubiflora

Pests
Saraca indica is host to the peacock mite Tuckerella channabasavannai.

References

 De Wilde, W. J. J. O. (1985). Saraca tubiflora, A New Species from West-central Sumatra (Caesalpinioideae). Blumea 30: 425-428.
 Hooker, Joseph Dalton. (1879). The Flora of British India, Vol II. London: L. Reeve & Co.
 Mabberley, D. J. (1987). The Plant Book: A Portable Dictionary of the Higher Plants. Cambridge: Cambridge University Press. .
 Blaxell, D., Bryant, G., Francis, F., Greig, D., Guest, S., Moore, J., North, T., Paddison, V., Roberts, S., Rodd, T., Scholer, P., Segall, B., Stowar, J., Walsh, K. (2001) "The Firefly Encyclopedia of Trees and Shrubs." Willowdale, Ontario: Firefly Books Ltd.  .

External links

 
Fabaceae genera